Billionaire Boys Club is a 2018 American biographical crime drama film directed by James Cox and co-written by Cox and Captain Mauzner. The film is about the social club and Ponzi scheme of the same name. The film stars Ansel Elgort, Taron Egerton, Emma Roberts, Kevin Spacey, Jeremy Irvine, Thomas Cocquerel, Rosanna Arquette, Cary Elwes, and Judd Nelson. The film is based on the real life Billionaire Boys Club from Southern California during the 1980s, a group of rich teenagers who get involved in a Ponzi scheme and eventual murder. The story was previously made into a television film in 1987, which starred Judd Nelson as Joe Hunt, while he plays that character's father in the 2018 version.

Originally announced in 2010 and filmed in 2015, Billionaire Boys Club is one of the final works that Spacey filmed prior to numerous sexual misconduct allegations made against him in 2017, and the accusations directly affected the film's release schedule and marketing. The film was released in the United States through video on demand on July 17, 2018, prior to a limited release on August 17, 2018, by Vertical Entertainment, and was a commercial failure. The domestic opening weekend box office take of just $618 was the lowest of Spacey's career. The film was panned by critics, although Spacey's performance was praised.

Plot
Led by their fellow preppie friend Joe Hunt, a group of wealthy young men in 1980s Los Angeles come up with a plan to get rich quick with a Ponzi scheme. The plan ends badly for all involved when Hunt and friend Tim Pittman end up murdering investor and con man Ron Levin.

Cast
 Ansel Elgort as Joe Hunt, the group leader and a financial expert.
 Taron Egerton as Dean Karny, his school buddy and closest ally within the BBC, who eventually becomes a witness against him.
 Emma Roberts as Sydney Evans, the love interest of Hunt.
 Kevin Spacey as Ron Levin, a Beverly Hills high roller.
 Ryan Rottman as Scott Biltmore, Kyle's twin brother and one of the two handsome twins adopted by the owner of Maybelline, who first invested in the Club. 
 Jeremy Irvine as Kyle Biltmore, Scott's twin brother and one of the members of the Billionaire Boys Club.
 Thomas Cocquerel as Charlie Bottoms
 Bokeem Woodbine as Tim Pittman, a bouncer who becomes involved in the club's doings.
 Barney Harris as Reza "Izzy" Eslaminia, The Persian's son and Billionaire Boys Club member.
 Waleed Zuaiter as The Persian (real name Hedayat Eslaminia), Izzy's Father
 Suki Waterhouse as Quintana "Q" Bisset, the love interest of Karny.
 Billie Lourd as Rosanna Ricci, the love interest of Biltmore. 
 Judd Nelson as Ryan Hunt, Joe's father
 Maurice Johnson as Detective
 Billy Slaughter as Loan Officer
 Rosanna Arquette as Debbie Evans, Sydney's mother
 Cary Elwes as Andy Warhol
 Justin Arnold as Carter
 Marc Mani as Dr. Marc Mani Jr.
 Carmen Illán as The Persian's wife

Production
In May 2010, The Hollywood Reporter confirmed that James Cox would direct the crime thriller film Billionaire Boys Club, the true story of a group of rich young boys in Los Angeles during the early 1980s who started the Billionaire Boys Club to run a Ponzi scheme. Cox wrote the script in four months after an exclusive research of the events with his brother Stephen, who spent another four months on it. Cox gathered the material for the screenplay from court documents, oral transcripts, and published articles. He said, "as we were writing this, I thought, 'What if 'Wall Street' became 'Alpha Dog' halfway through?" Holly Wiersma would produce the film.

On October 29, 2015, Ansel Elgort and Taron Egerton joined the cast, with Elgort playing Joe Hunt, the group leader and financial expert, and Egerton playing Dean Karny, a pro tennis player. Captain Mauzner also co-wrote the script along with Cox, while producers on the film would be Wiersma and Cassian Elwes. The film would be financed by Armory Films, and Good Universe would handle the international sales. In November 2015, Kevin Spacey signed on to play Ron Levin, a Beverly Hills high roller, Emma Roberts was added to the cast to portray Sydney, Hunt's love interest and Suki Waterhouse was cast to play Quintana, Karny's love interest.

In December 2015, Variety reported that Judd Nelson, who originally played Joe Hunt in the 1987 miniseries Billionaire Boys Club, would play the role of Ryan Hunt, Joe's father. That same month, Ryan Rottman signed on to portray Scott Biltmore, one of the two handsome twins adopted by the owner of Maybelline, who first invested in the Club and Thomas Cocquerel joined the film. Bokeem Woodbine, Billie Lourd and Jeremy Irvine also joined the cast of the film, with Irvine playing Kyle Biltmore, one of the members of the Billionaire Boys Club, Lourd as Rosanna, his love interest, and Woodbine as a club bouncer who becomes involved in the club's doings.

Principal photography began in New Orleans on December 7, 2015. The film wrapped on January 25, 2016, with re-shoots set for November of the same year.

Release
The film was initially released through video on demand on July 17, 2018, prior to a limited release in theaters on August 17, 2018, by Vertical Entertainment.

Despite allegations of sexual misconduct being made against Kevin Spacey in October 2017, Vertical Entertainment stated that they would be going forward with the release of the film:

Reception

Box office
Billionaire Boys Club grossed a total worldwide of $2.7 million and $1,349 in North America, against a production budget of $15 million. On its opening day in the United States, the film earned $126 from ten theaters, the worst opening for a film starring Kevin Spacey. TheWrap noted that the ten theaters where the film was shown were mostly located in areas which were not considered to be major markets, and that some of the theaters showing the film scheduled their screenings for off-peak times, such as early in the morning or late at night. The weekend total gross ended up at $618, with a final theater count of eleven.

Critical response
On Metacritic, the film has a weighted average score of 30 out of 100, based on 5 critics, indicating "generally unfavorable reviews".

Mick LaSalle of the San Francisco Chronicle said that he has no doubt that "Spacey is very good at playing the bad guy" and that although only in a supporting role "dominates every moment of every scene in which he appears". LaSalle was unconvinced by the idea that Hunt made "bad decisions involving thousands [that] led to more bad decisions" but rather "the storm was of his own making" and concludes as his "life unravels, so does the movie". Eric Kohn at IndieWire called it a "wannabe Wolf of Wall Street" and said that it is "intermittently engaging as a B-movie" but "never finds a satisfying tone." John DeFore at The Hollywood Reporter called the film "a derivative bore" and accused it of being "creatively clueless" for "indulging in this period piece without finding some fresh critique".

Awards and nominations

References

External links 
 
 

2018 biographical drama films
2018 crime drama films
2018 crime thriller films
2018 thriller drama films
2010s American films
2010s business films
2010s English-language films
American biographical drama films
American business films
American crime drama films
American crime thriller films
American thriller drama films
Biographical films about criminals
Casting controversies in film
Crime films based on actual events
Cultural depictions of Andy Warhol
Film controversies in the United States
Films about fraud
Films about organizations
Films about the upper class
Films directed by James Cox
Films set in the 1980s
Films set in Los Angeles
Films shot in Los Angeles County, California
Films shot in New Orleans
Obscenity controversies in film
Thriller films based on actual events
Vertical Entertainment films